Charlie Williams (born 1971) is an English writer who has published six novels and a number of shorter works. Williams grew up in the town of Worcester on the borders of Western England, and was educated at Swansea University.

Books
Five of Williams' novels comprise The Mangel Series, about nightclub doorman Royston Blake and set in the fictional town of Mangel, which is based loosely on Worcester itself. Deadfolk was published in 2004, Fags and Lager in 2005, King of the Road in 2006, One Dead Hen in 2011 and Made of Stone in 2013. Comic, rural noir in the style of writers such as Jim Thompson, they use a colloquial first-person narrative throughout, in dialect, with Royston Blake as narrator. Thematically the novels explore dysfunctional masculinity and the decline and alienation of provincial Britain, and are littered with references to popular cultural icons of the seventies and eighties (Blake's, and Williams', formative period). Previous to the success of the Mangel Trilogy Williams had attempted for some years to break into the horror genre, and the sensibilities of that field are detectable in his published work (see, for example, the chainsaw scene in Deadfolk).

Other notable works are the novel Stairway to Hell (2009), the novella Graven Image (2011) and the screenplay for the short film Ark.

Personal life
Williams lives outside Worcester with his family.

References

21st-century English novelists
1971 births
Living people
Alumni of Swansea University
People educated at the Royal Grammar School Worcester
English male novelists
21st-century English male writers